The Honda 70 (later rebadged as the Honda CD70) is a four stroke motorcycle produced by Honda of Japan from 1970 to 1991. Production moved to Atlas Honda of Pakistan, in 1991.

Models from the year 1970 to 1983 were sold under the name “Honda 70”, with “Honda 70” markings on the side covers. 

The engines continued to be upgraded every few years. In 1984, the Honda 70 was rebranded as the Honda CD70. 

In 2012, the CD70 saw some cosmetic upgrades, chrome turn signals were replaced with all black plastic ones, along with a few other visual changes.

In 2014, Atlas Pakistan reduced the weight of the newer production models, for improved fuel efficiency.

External links 
Official website
Honda CD 70 2023 Fuel Average
Honda CD 70 2023 Price in Pakistan

70
Motorcycles introduced in 1970
Standard motorcycles